TDK Cross Central was a dance music festival run by TDK Corporation and held in Kings Cross, London, England from 2004 to 2007. It included performances from the likes of Goldfrapp and Grace Jones.

References

External links
 Cross Central web site

Music festivals in London
Dance festivals in the United Kingdom
Annual events in London
Recurring events established in 2004
2004 establishments in England
Recurring events disestablished in 2007